The Old Frio County Jail, in Pearsall, Texas, was built in 1884.  It was listed on the National Register of Historic Places in 1979. It serves as the Frio Pioneer Jail Museum.

It was built by P.J. Pauly & Bro.  It is a two-story Victorian-style building with "elaborately moulded brickwork and functional thick plastered brick walls", and is "An excellent and well-preserved example of public Victorian architecture in rural Texas."

It is a Texas State Antiquities Landmark and a Recorded Texas Historic Landmark.

References

External links

Jails in Texas
Museums in Frio County, Texas
National Register of Historic Places in Frio County, Texas
Victorian architecture in Texas
Government buildings completed in 1884
History museums in Texas